Glass is a 2003 EP by The Sea and Cake.

Track listing
 "To the Author" (version 1) – 5:28
 "To the Author" (version 2) – 6:10
 "Traditional Wax Coin" – 4:59
 "An Echo In" – 4:30
 "Tea and Cake" (mix by Stereolab) – 4:00
 "Interiors" (Broadcast remix) – 3:21
 "Hotel Tell" (C's mix) – 8:52

References

2003 EPs
The Sea and Cake albums
Thrill Jockey EPs